Thomas Lundqvist may refer to:

Thomas Lundqvist (geologist) (born 1932), Swedish geologist
Thomas Lundqvist (sailor), Swedish Olympic sailor